The Carrie Tingley Hospital Historic District, at 992 Broadway in Truth or Consequences, New Mexico, was developed in 1936. It was listed as a historic district on the National Register of Historic Places in 2005.

References

Historic districts on the National Register of Historic Places in New Mexico
National Register of Historic Places in Sierra County, New Mexico
Buildings and structures completed in 1936